Davit Bolkvadze (born 5 June 1980) is a Georgian footballer who currently plays as a midfielder for Merani Tbilisi. He was capped for the national team on 12 September 2007.

External links
 
 

1980 births
Living people
Georgia (country) international footballers
Footballers from Georgia (country)
Expatriate footballers from Georgia (country)
Expatriate footballers in Azerbaijan
Footballers from Tbilisi
Simurq PIK players
FC Guria Lanchkhuti players
FC Metalurgi Rustavi players
Expatriate sportspeople from Georgia (country) in Azerbaijan
FC Torpedo Kutaisi players
FC Sioni Bolnisi players
FC Zugdidi players
FC Chikhura Sachkhere players
FC Dila Gori players
FC Merani Martvili players
Association football midfielders